Events in the year 858 in Japan.

Events

 October 7 – Emperor Montoku dies after an 8-year reign. He is succeeded by his 8-year-old son Seiwa as the 56th emperor of Japan, with Fujiwara no Yoshifusa (Seiwa's grandfather) governing as regent and great minister of the Council of State.

Births

Incumbents
Monarch: Montoku then Seiwa

Deaths
October 7 - Emperor Montoku (born 826)

References

858
9th century in Japan